Pfitzneriana prosopus is a moth of the family Hepialidae first described by Herbert Druce in 1901. It is found in Colombia.

References

Moths described in 1901
Hepialidae